Riske is a surname. Notable people with the surname include:

Alison Riske (born 1990), American tennis player
David Riske (born 1976), American baseball player
Jan Riske (born 1932), Dutch painter
Jeroom Riske (1919–2000), Belgian gymnast

See also
Riske Creek